Muttahida Qaumi Movement (abbreviated MQM) is a name currently claimed by two competing Pakistani political factions:

 Muttahida Qaumi Movement – London, a political faction managed from London
 Muttahida Qaumi Movement – Pakistan, a political party in Pakistan